John Robert Quigley (born 1 December 1948) is an Australian barrister, solicitor and politician in Western Australia. A member of the ALP, he has served as a member of the Western Australian Legislative Assembly from the 2001 election until the present, initially as the Member for Innaloo (2001–2005) until that seat's abolition in an electoral redistribution, then as the Member for Mindarie (2005-2013) until that seat's abolition in an electoral redistribution and is currently the Member for Butler.  , he is the state's Attorney-General and Minister for Electoral Affairs in the second McGowan ministry after holding the position of Attorney General and Minister for Commerce in the McGowan Ministry.

Early life 
He was born on 1 December 1948 in Perth, Western Australia, and was educated at Aquinas College, Perth. He was the lawyer for the Western Australian Police Union for 20 years before entering state parliament in 2001. He became an honorary life member of the union in 2000.

Politics 
In 2007, his life membership of the Western Australian Police Union was withdrawn after his parliamentary attack on police involved with the Andrew Mallard case, where he named a former undercover policeman who had a role in Mallard's unjust conviction. He planned to melt down his life membership badge, have it made into a tiepin with the words Veritas Vincit— "Truth Conquers", the motto of the school he attended—and present it to Mallard.

In 2008, Quigley and two other MPs were cleared by the Corruption and Crime Commission in relation to allegations of dealings with lobbyist Brian Burke. Burke approached the MPs in order to launch a parliamentary enquiry that would favour one of his associates.

In 2011, he was accused of bringing the legal profession into disrepute, a charge stemming from his campaign to expose the wrongful jailing of Andrew Mallard for murder, to which he replied "...if you take on corrupt police you will be pursued and they will try and destroy you." In November 2011 Quigley was fined $3000 by the State Administrative Tribunal for professional misconduct, again in relation to his successful campaign against police in the Mallard case.

As Minister for Electoral Affairs since the 2021 election, Quigley has been overseeing potential reforms to the voting system for the Western Australian Legislative Council. In April 2021, he formed a panel to examine potential reform of that voting system. The panel was led by former Governor of Western Australia Malcolm McCusker, and consisted of four electoral and constitutional law experts.

References

1948 births
Members of the Western Australian Legislative Assembly
Living people
Australian barristers
People educated at Aquinas College, Perth
Politicians from Perth, Western Australia
Australian Labor Party members of the Parliament of Western Australia
21st-century Australian politicians